The 2016 NextEra Energy Resources 250 is the first race in the 2016 NASCAR Camping World Truck Series season. It was held at Daytona International Speedway in Daytona Beach, Florida on February 19, 2016.

Report

Background

Daytona International Speedway is a race track in Daytona Beach, Florida, United States. Since opening in 1959, it has been the home of the Daytona 500, the most prestigious race in NASCAR. In addition to NASCAR, the track also hosts races of ARCA, AMA Superbike, USCC, SCCA, and Motocross. The track's  infield includes the  Lake Lloyd, which has hosted powerboat racing. The speedway is owned and operated by International Speedway Corporation.

The track was built in 1959 by NASCAR founder William "Bill" France, Sr. to host racing held at the former Daytona Beach Road Course. His banked design permitted higher speeds and gave fans a better view of the cars. Lights were installed around the track in 1998 and today, it is the third-largest single lit outdoor sports facility. The speedway has been renovated three times, with the infield renovated in 2004 and the track repaved twice — in 1978 and in 2010.

On January 22, 2013, the track unveiled artist depictions of a renovated speedway. On July 5 of that year, ground was broken for a project that would remove the backstretch seating and completely redevelop the frontstretch seating. The renovation to the speedway is being worked on by Rossetti Architects. The project, named "Daytona Rising", was completed in January 2016, and it costed US $400 million, placing emphasis on improving fan experience with five expanded and redesigned fan entrances (called "injectors") as well as wider and more comfortable seating with more restrooms and concession stands. After the renovations, the track's grandstands include 101,000 permanent seats with the ability to increase permanent seating to 125,000. The project was completed before the start of Speedweeks 2016.

Entry list

Practice and qualifying

First practice
Timothy Peters had the fastest lap at a 47.612 (189.028 mph). Ben Rhodes had the fastest 10 lap average. Scott Lagasse Jr. did not finish a timed lap during the session.

Top 5

Second practice
Spencer Gallagher had the fastest lap, a 47.838 (188.135 mph). Timothy Peters had the best 10 lap average.

Top 5

Qualifying

Race results

References

2016 in NASCAR
2016 in sports in Florida
February 2016 sports events in the United States
NASCAR races at Daytona International Speedway